Daniel Contet (3 November 1943 – 23 October 2018) was a French international tennis player. He competed in 16 ties for the French Davis Cup team between 1961 and 1969.

Career finals

Doubles (1 title, 1 runner-up)

References

External links 
 
 
 

1943 births
2018 deaths
French male tennis players
Sportspeople from Seine-Saint-Denis